Kellett School, The British International School in Hong Kong, is an international co-educational school in Hong Kong and member of the Federation of British International Schools in Asia. Founded in 1976, the school's aim is to provide a British style education to students in Hong Kong.

The school's original campus and preparatory school in Pok Fu Lam overlooks Kellett Bay, from where the school gets its name. The school's second preparatory school and Senior School is at Kowloon Bay and opened in 2013. The School is a member of The Headmasters’ and Headmistress’ Conference (HMC), a professional association of the heads of the world's leading independent schools. The heads of the Prep Schools are members of The Independent Association of Prep Schools (IAPS).

History
Kellett was founded in 1976 by parents who wanted a high-quality, British-style education, rich in the Arts and Sport. The parents disliked perceived high class sizes in other schools, and wished to have a school with smaller classes. Originally called Starters, the school was led by Joanne Elliott and her family, working with the first Principal, Vivienne Steer. The school’s first two classes were made up of British, American, Australian, Chinese, Japanese, Korean, Indian, Pakistani, Iranian, Norwegian, and Swedish children.

By 1977, the School had tripled to 122 students and had relocated. Its Taikoo Shing facility started operations in January 1978. In 1980, the School moved to a purpose-built facility in Wah Fu overlooking Kellett Bay. At the time it had its first phase established. In 1981 the second phase of the new facility opened. This School now comprises Kellett's Pok Fu Lam campus. The School’s second Principal Ann McDonald arrived in 1996 after the retirement of Vivienne Steer.

The growing shortage of local senior school places prompted the Board to extend the School to age 13, offering pupils full UK Preparatory provision. Alongside this extension, the Board sought a permanent Senior School site. In 2007, the school was awarded a temporary Senior site, to be shared with Elsa High School (Carmel School Association) in Shau Kei Wan, less than a kilometre from the Preparatory School's earlier site in Taikoo Shing.

The popularity of Kellett’s Senior School meant that once again the Board sought to expand. In August 2009, the Hong Kong government awarded Kellett a greenfield site in Kowloon Bay, to develop an additional Preparatory School and a purpose-built four form Senior School which opened in September 2013.

In 2018, Kellett was awarded membership of the Independent Association of Preparatory Schools (IAPS) and The Headmasters’ and Headmistress’ Conference (HMC).

Ann McDonald retired in 2019, after presiding over the School’s growth from a small primary to one of Hong Kong’s leading international schools. Mark Steed, Kellett’s third Principal and CEO, took the helm in July 2019 with a focus on using innovation to further Kellett’s educational aims.

Academic

Admission

Kellett has different forms of entrance conditions depending on the year of entry, and is increasingly selective of its students the older they are, as there is an expectation that they can cope with the understanding of the curriculum of previous years, if they are joining from Year One upwards. Basic ability in reading and writing is expected of students joining in Reception.  

Structure 

Students at Kellett, from Years Seven to Nine are required to attend English, Maths, Science, Geography, History, Music, Design & Technology, Drama, Art
Computer Science and Physical Education lessons. In Year Seven, a language choice of Mandarin, French and Spanish, and from Year Eight upwards, the additional choice of Latin and Coding is offered. 

In Years 10 and 11, students are prepared for IGCSEs in the following subjects: English Language, English Literature, Maths (with Further Maths also available for some), Chemistry, Biology and Physics. Students then select four further subjects from one or two languages, History, Geography, Business Studies, Economics, Media Studies, Art, Design Technology, Drama or Computer Science.

All students throughout the school take the award winning Positively Kellett course, a lesson designed to evaluate properties such as public speaking, and gives knowledge about the global goals, character strengths and anti-bullying.

Results

In the 2021-2022 A Levels, 7% achieved four A*, 17% achieved three A*, and a further 22% were awarded with four A-A*, and 67% of students taking IGCSE scored A-A*, and in 2021, 55% of students achieved an A* on their A Levels.

Operations
As of 2012 the school emphasised that its teachers need to have information technology skills.

In 2000 the class sizes went up to 23 students, around 10 below sizes of English Schools Foundation schools.

Campuses and Facilities
Kellet has campuses in Pok Fu Lam (primary) and Kowloon Bay (primary and secondary). There was a temporary campus in Shau Kei Wan which served as the secondary school campus, but the secondary division was moved to Kowloon Bay in 2013.

The Pok Fu Lam premises includes a large multi-use auditorium, a gymnasium, library, a fully equipped science lab, dance and drama studio, ICT suite, language lab, SEN learning support base, music rooms, art studio and a children’s bookshop. The “covered area” provides a large indoor space for the Reception and Year 1 children. Outside there is an Astroturf playground, adventure playground and garden and vegetable patch.

The Kowloon Bay campus welcomed its first cohort of Prep and Senior students in September 2013. The campus design was done by the P&T Group and won awards in 2016 including the International Property Awards title 'Best Public Service Architecture (Asia Pacific)' and the Asia Pacific Property Awards title as 'Best Public Service Architecture'. The facilities included in the 45,000sqm footprint include a fully operational theatre, a CrossFit gym, swimming pool and Sky Pitch. The Kowloon Bay campus has a swimming pool with six lanes that is located inside. It also has an auditorium and facilities for art and drama classes. Gardens were installed in the outside of the campus.

Houses 
 Bowen (Blue) – named after George Bowen, Governor of Hong Kong from March 1883 to 1887. He established the Hong Kong Observatory, founded the first college in Hong Kong, and ordered the construction of the Typhoon Shelter in Causeway Bay.
 Clementi (Orange) – named after Sir Cecil Clementi who served as Governor of Hong Kong between 1925 and 1930. Clementi was fluent in Cantonese and presided over the construction of Kai Tak Airport. He also ended Mui Tsai, the traditional Chinese "female maid servitude" system in the colony.
 MacLehose (Green) – named after Murray MacLehose, who was the 25th, and longest serving Governor of Hong Kong, from 1971 to 1982. MacLehose was a reforming figure who had Chinese recognised as an official language for communication, expanded welfare and public housing and oversaw the construction of the Mass Transit Railway (MTR).
 Youde (Yellow) – named after Sir Edward Youde who served as Governor of Hong Kong between May 1982 and his death in December 1986. Youde negotiated the Sino-British Joint Declaration, signed in Beijing in 1984, which confirmed the British would leave Hong Kong in 1997.

School structure 
The School is divided into two campuses and three schools. The Pok Fu Lam Campus hosts one of the prep schools and the Kowloon Bay Campus hosts the second prep school and the senior school in one building. These form the basis of the pastoral structure of the school.

Pok Fu Lam Preparatory School (Pok Fu Lam)
 Reception to Year 6
 3 form entry

Kowloon Bay Preparatory School (Kowloon Bay)
 Reception to Year 6
 2 form entry

Kowloon Bay Senior School (Kowloon Bay)
 Year 7 to Year 13
 4 form entry

Fees and Inspection
In 2022/2023, fees were HK$180,400 for preparatory students, HK$224,200 for students in years 7-11 and HK$230,700 for students in years 12-13. 

As Kellett school is a not-for-profit international school, all fees or generated income is reinvested back into the school.

In March 2016, the school’s inspection was carried out under the British School Overseas (BSO) inspection framework which concluded “Kellett School is an outstanding school”. In December 2021 Kellett was awarded the highest status, Patron's Accredited Member, by COBIS Council for British International Schools, following an accreditation visit.

See also
 Britons in Hong Kong
 Hong Kong: Asia's World City

References

Further reading
 

International schools in Hong Kong
Private schools in Hong Kong
British international schools in Hong Kong
Educational institutions established in 1976
1976 establishments in Hong Kong
Kwun Tong District
Southern District, Hong Kong